The 2006 United States House of Representatives elections in New Mexico were held on November 4, 2006 to determine who will represent the state of New Mexico in the United States House of Representatives. New Mexico has three seats in the House, apportioned according to the 2000 United States Census. Representatives are elected for two-year terms. As of 2020, this is the last time that Republicans won a majority of congressional districts in New Mexico.

Overview

District 1 

 

Incumbent Republican Heather Wilson defeated Democrat Patricia A. Madrid, the State Attorney General by a very slim margin. This district covers the central part of the state.

District 2 

 

Incumbent Republican Steve Pearce defeated Democrat Albert Kissling. The district covers the southern part of the state.

District 3 

 

Incumbent Democrat Tom Udall defeated Republican Ronald Dolin. The district covers the northern part of the state.

References 

2006 New Mexico elections
New Mexico

2006